Woodbine Historic District may refer to:

in the United States
(by state)
 Woodbine Historic District (Woodbine, Georgia), listed on the NRHP in Georgia
 Woodbine (New Albany, Indiana), listed on the NRHP in Indiana
 Woodbine-Palmetto-Gates Historic District, New York, NY, listed on the NRHP in New York

See also 
 Woodbine (disambiguation)